Isabella Laböck (also spelled Laboeck, born 6 April 1986 in Prien am Chiemsee) is a German snowboarder.

Laböck won gold in the parallel giant slalom at the 2013 FIS Snowboarding World Championships.

References

External links
  (archive)
 
 
 
 

1986 births
Living people
German female snowboarders
Olympic snowboarders of Germany
Snowboarders at the 2014 Winter Olympics
People from Rosenheim (district)
Sportspeople from Upper Bavaria
21st-century German women